Delfina Guzmán Correa (born 7 April 1928) is a Chilean actress. She has appeared in more than 30 films and television shows since 1968. She starred in the 1968 Raúl Ruiz film Three Sad Tigers. She is the daughter of Florencio Guzmán Larraín and María Luisa Correa Ugarte. Her son, Nicolás Eyzaguirre, is a Chilean economist.

Selected filmography
 Three Sad Tigers (1968)
 The Expropriation (1972)
 La Nana (2009) as the Grandmother
 Bombal (2012) as Grandmother

Filmography

References

External links

1928 births
Living people
20th-century Chilean actresses
21st-century Chilean actresses
Chilean film actresses
Chilean television actresses
Chilean telenovela actresses
Actresses from Santiago
Guzman